This article lists events that occurred during 1999 in Estonia.

Incumbents

 President – Lennart Meri
 Prime Minister – Mart Siimann (until 25 March), Mart Laar (after 25 March)
 Speaker – Toomas Savi

Events
7 March – 1999 Estonian parliamentary election.
25 March – Mart Laar's second cabinet was formed.
17 October – 1999 Estonian municipal elections.
Meriton Grand Hotel was opened.

Births

Deaths
16 May – Lembit Oll, Estonian chess player

See also
 1999 in Estonian football
 1999 in Estonian television

References

 
1990s in Estonia
Estonia
Estonia
Years of the 20th century in Estonia